Oky Derry Andryan (born 8 September 1993 in Malang) is an Indonesian professional footballer who plays as a defensive midfielder for Liga 2 club Putra Delta Sidoarjo.

Club career

Arema FC
He began his career in Arema U-21. and was appointed as a captain. In 2015, he was recommended by the coach for a contract and joined Arema FC. He is a defender

Persib Balikpapan (loan)
He was signed for Persiba Balikpapan to play in the Liga 1 in the 2017 season, on loan from Arema.

Persis Solo
In 2018, Oky Derry signed a contract with Indonesian Liga 2 club Persis Solo.

Honours

Club
Arema
 Indonesia President's Cup: 2017

References

External links
 
 Oky Derry Andryan at Liga Indonesia

1993 births
Living people
Indonesian footballers
Sportspeople from Malang
Arema F.C. players
Association football midfielders
Association football defenders